Larry W. Crouse (born September 12, 1944) is an American politician of the Republican Party. He was a member of the Washington House of Representatives, representing the 4th legislative district.

Personal life 
Crouse's wife is Peggy Crouse. They have two children. Crouse and his family live in Spokane, Washington.

References

External links 
 Larry Crouse at ballotpedia.org

1944 births
Living people
Republican Party members of the Washington House of Representatives